The Institute of Public Administration New Zealand (IPANZ) is a voluntary public administration organisation. IPANZ states their goal is to 
"promoting improvements in public policy and in administration and management in the public sector in New Zealand, and to increasing public understanding of the work undertaken in the public sector".

IPANZ publish a quarterly journal called Public Sector and run annual awards for the New Zealand public sector called the IPANZ GEN-I Public Sector Excellence Awards.

History
The "Public Service Administration Society" originated in Christchurch in 1934. Similar societies subsequently established (in Wellington, Auckland and Dunedin) then merged in 1936 to form the New Zealand Institute of Public Administration.

References

External links
http://www.ipanz.org.nz/
IPANZ Awards

Professional associations based in New Zealand
Public administration